Kathavampatti is a village in the Annavasal Revenue block of Pudukkottai district, Tamil Nadu, India.

Demographics 

As per the 2011 census, Kathavampatti had a total population of 1019 with 491 males and 547 females. Out of the total population 646    people were literate.

References

Villages in Pudukkottai district